Port Said International School is the American Section of the Port Said International Schools in Port Said, Egypt. It is the first International School in Port Said and the first international school to be accredited by the Commission on International and Trans-Regional Accreditation and fully licensed by the Egyptian Ministry of Education in the region, the school also host exchange students from different countries in the world.

The school was opened for enrollment in May 2005, starting with summer school to improve the level of applicants to the school. The first academic year was 2005–2006. The school was built and fully equipped by Port Said Executive Office (part of Port Said Governorate). Management of the school was assigned to Ms Nadia Hafez (Chairperson) who was responsible for providing management, teaching, administrative and supporting staff to run the school. The running of the school was assigned to Mr.Nicholas Florence in July 2005 then with Ms Noha.

Staff

Education
The school has a national and international curriculum. The National section or Port Said Integrated Language School offers tuition from Kindergarten to Grade 12 and the International section or Port Said International School caters for Kindergarten to Grade 12 and follows an American curriculum. The school's International section offers an American curriculum, while the national section provides a more advanced version of the Egyptian curriculum.

References

External links
 http://www.portsaidinternationalschools.com
 http://pis.edu.eg

Schools in Port Said